Shoksha is a rural locality (a settlement) in Pakshengskoye Rural Settlement of Velsky District, Arkhangelsk Oblast, Russia. The population was 102 as of 2014. There are 5 streets.

Geography 
Shoksha is located 49 km north of Velsk (the district's administrative centre) by road. Kulakovo-Podgorye is the nearest rural locality.

References 

Rural localities in Velsky District